The 1946 Campeonato Nacional de Fútbol Profesional was Chilean first tier’s 14th season. Audax Italiano was the tournament’s champion, winning its second title.

First stage

Scores

Standings

Championship stage

Scores

Standings

Non-Championship stage

Scores

Standings

Aggregate standings

Topscorer

References

External links 
ANFP 
RSSSF Chile 1946

Primera División de Chile seasons
Primera
Chile